We Die Young is a 2019 American direct-to-video action film directed by Lior Geller, and starring Jean-Claude Van Damme, David Castañeda, and Elijah Rodriguez.

Cast 

 Elijah Rodriguez as Lucas
 Jean-Claude Van Damme as Daniel
 David Castañeda as Rincon
 Nicholas Sean Johnny as Miguel
 Charlie MacGechan  as Jester
 Joana Metrass  as Anna
 Dean John-Wilson as Mousey
 Jim Caesar  as Fellx
 Kerry Bennett as Brenda
 Jacob Scipio as Tomas
 Joseph Long as Luis

Reception
Common Sense Media rated the film 2 out of 5 stars. 

Simon Abrams of Roger Ebert.com rated it 2 stars, saying "We Die Young follows a poorly defined audience surrogate, one who does what he's told without ever really standing apart from his guardians."

James Lindorf of Red Carper Crash praised the direction and the performance of lead actor Jean-Claude Van Damme. 

John Delia of Aced Magazine gave the film 4 out of 5 stars calling the film “Shocking, violent and emotional…” stating of director Lior Geller's work, “Geller… sets up the audience for a front row seat on a Godfather resembling movie.” "

References

External links